The Calm Sea is an 1869 painting by Gustave Courbet. Done in oil on canvas, the seascape depicts a beach on the Normandy coast stretched out before the English Channel. The painting is in the collection of the Metropolitan Museum of Art, in New York.

References

1869 paintings
Paintings by Gustave Courbet
Paintings in the collection of the Metropolitan Museum of Art
Water in art